Vitamin String Quartet (VSQ) is an American musical group from Los Angeles known for its series of tribute albums to rock and pop acts. 

VSQ is a series of string quartet projects developed and produced by CMH Label Group, an independent record company based in Los Angeles. The CMH team works with an evolving cast of arrangers, producers, string players, and other creatives on each project. Their albums are released through Vitamin Records and primarily performed by a string quartet, although other instruments have been used. "Vitamin String Quartet is about applying rock n' roll attitude to classical technique," said Tom Tally, a violist and arranger who has performed on and produced over 50 Vitamin String Quartet albums.

Their albums feature various genres, including pop and rock, metal, emo, punk, techno, country, and hip-hop, and a wide variety of groups, such as The Beach Boys, Gorillaz, Oasis, Simple Plan, Queen, Led Zeppelin, The Offspring, Rush, Michael Jackson, The Beatles, Senses Fail, Black Sabbath, Iron Maiden, Bruce Springsteen, Crossfade, Jimi Hendrix, The Smashing Pumpkins, Radiohead, Modest Mouse, System of a Down, The Killers, Red Hot Chili Peppers, Coldplay, Linkin Park, Muse, Thirty Seconds to Mars, Slayer, Adele, Lady Gaga, and Lana Del Rey among others. Their discography includes over 400 albums.

The group began in 1999 "as an experiment in transforming rock and pop songs with classical instruments." It later expanded to include a variety of popular music.

From 2012 until 2014, their music was played 24 hours a day on the  FM broadcast station WWHK in Concord, New Hampshire.

In popular culture 

In 2008, VSQ contributed a recording of "Jack and Sally Montage" to Nightmare Revisited, on which the original score for the 1993 film The Nightmare Before Christmas was reinterpreted by bands like Tiger Army, The All-American Rejects, Plain White T's, Rise Against, and DeVotchKa.

Songs by Vitamin String Quartet were featured on the Fox television show So You Think You Can Dance twice in 2008. "Control" from Vitamin String Quartet Tribute To Janet Jackson appeared on an episode that aired on July 30, 2008, and "Hallelujah" from Vitamin String Quartet Tribute To Paramore appeared on an episode that aired the day after. Songs appeared again on the show in Season 6 in 2009. Legacy Perez used "Flashing Lights" by Kanye West as a track for a solo elimination dance that aired December 9, 2009. "Yellow", originally by Coldplay, featured on the show with guest dancers on the Top 10 elimination show, The Legion of Extraordinary Dancers. This episode aired on  December 2, 2009.

In June 2009, they branched out by including a few original songs on their album Per_Versions, which also included covers of bands such as Broken Social Scene, No Age , and Sigur Rós.

Two songs from Vitamin String Quartet Tribute to Coldplay, "Yellow" and "Clocks," were used in an episode the of TV show The Vampire Diaries on April 22, 2010.

In 2011, Vitamin String Quartet backed Thirty Seconds to Mars for their MTV Unplugged performance and appeared on the EP recording of the concert.

Vitamin String Quartet covered INXS's "Never Tear Us Apart" and Pat Benatar's "We Belong" in the 100th episode of Gossip Girl.

Vitamin String Quartet's cover of "Home" by Edward Sharpe and the Magnetic Zeros was featured in the finale of the fifth season of Modern Family on May 21, 2014.

Vitamin String Quartet's cover of Nine Inch Nails' "Something I Can Never Have" was featured in the fifth episode of the first season of the HBO series Westworld, "Contrapasso", and their cover of Radiohead's "Motion Picture Soundtrack" was featured in episode six, "The Adversary".

Vitamin String Quartet's cover of the Red Hot Chili Peppers "Scar Tissue" was featured on the soundtrack of King of Staten Island in 2020.

Vitamin String Quartet has many covers featured in the Netflix series Bridgerton, such as Nirvana's "Stay Away" and Robyn's "Dancing On My Own".

Partial discography

0–9
The String Quartet Tribute to 3 Doors Down
The String Quartet Tribute to 311

A
 Back in Baroque: The String Quartet Tribute to AC/DC
 Vitamin String Quartet Performs AC/DC
 Vitamin String Quartet Performs Adele's Skyfall (single release)
 Vitamin String Quartet Performs Adele
 Vitamin String Quartet Performs Adele's Rumour Has It (single release)
 Vitamin String Quartet Performs Amy Winehouse
 The String Quartet Tribute to Aerosmith
 String Quartet Tribute to AFI
 The String Quartet Tribute to Alice in Chains
 Precious Things: The String Quartet Tribute to Tori Amos (2001)
 Pieces: The String Quartet Tribute to Tori Amos, Vol. 2 (2007)
 String QuaTributeibute to Animal Collective: Banshee Beat
 Vitamin String Quartet Performs As I Lay Dying's An Ocean Between Us
 Vitamin String Quartet Performs Arcade Fire
 String Quartet Tribute to Arcade Fire's Funeral
 String Quartet Tribute to Atreyu
 String Quartet Tribute to Audioslave
 String Quartet Tribute to Avicii's Wake Me Up
 String Quartet Tribute to Avenged Sevenfold

B
 The String Quartet Tribute to Bad Religion: History Repeating
 String Quartet Tribute to Bastille's Pompeii
 The String Quartet Tribute to The Beach Boys' Pet Sounds
 The String Quartet Tribute to The Beatles
 The String Quartet Tribute to Björk
 The String Quartet Tribute To Björk: The Remixes
 Ice - The String Tribute To Björk
 The String Quartet Tribute to Black Sabbath
 The String Quartet Tribute to Blue October
 The String Quartet Tribute to Bob Dylan
 The String Quartet Tribute to Bon Jovi: Count Me In
 The String Quartet Tribute to Breaking Benjamin
 The String Quartet Tributes to Bright Eyes' Beautiful in the Morning
 The String Quartet Tribute to Jimmy Buffett
 The String Quartet Tribute to Bullet for My Valentine
 The String Quartet Performs Bush
 Vitamin String Quartet Performs The Beatles Vol. 2
 Vitamin String Quartet Performs Blink 182
 Vitamin String Quartet Performs Bon Iver
 VSQ Performs The Black Keys

C

 String Quartet Tribute to Casting Crowns
 An Evening with Diablo: The String Tribute to Chevelle
 String Quartet Tribute to Coheed and Cambria's In Keeping Secrets of Silent Earth: 3
 String Quartet Tribute to Coldplay
 String Quartet Tribute to Coldplay, Vol. 2.
 Vitamin String Quartet Performs Coldplay's Viva la Vida
 Vitamin String Quartet Performs Coldplay's Mylo Xyloto
 String Quartet Tribute to The Cure
 Vitamin String Quartet Performs Chandelier by Sia

D
 String Quartet Tribute to The Dark Side of the Moon
 The String Quartet Tribute to Dashboard Confessional: B-Sides of the String Sessions
 Songs You Have Come to Love The Most: A String Quartet Tribute to Dashboard Confessional
 String Quartet Tribute to Daughtry
 String Quartet Tribute to Dave Matthews Band
 String Quartet Tribute to David Bowie
 String Quartet Tribute to David Gray
 Ghost: The String Quartet Tribute to Death Cab for Cutie
 Vitamin String Quartet Performs The Decemberists
 String Quartet Tribute to Deftones
 String Quartet Tribute to Depeche Mode
 String Quartet Tribute to Dido
 Are You Breathing: The String Quartet to Disturbed
 String Quartet Tribute to The Doors
 The String Quartet Tribute to Dream Theater
 String Quartet Tribute to Duran Duran
 String Quartet Tribute to DragonForce
 String Quartet Tribute to DragonForce: Through the Fire and the Flames
 Crenshaw Classics: The String Quartet Tribute to Dr. Dre
 The String Quartet Tribute to Disturbed

E
 String Quartet Tribute to The Eagles
 String Quartet Tribute to Eric Clapton
 Immortalized: The String Quartet Tribute to Evanescence
 The String Quartet Tribute to Evanescence
 The String Quartet Tribute to Elliott Smith
 The String Quartet Tribute to Eminem

F
 String Quartet Tribute to Fall Out Boy
 String Quartet Tribute to Fall Out Boy Vol. 2
 Strung Out on Fiona Apple: A String Quartet Tribute
 String Quartet Tribute to Finger Eleven
 String Quartet Tribute to The Flaming Lips
 String Quartet Tribute to Fleetwood Mac
 Rumours: The String Quartet Tribute to Fleetwood Mac
 Vitamin String Quartet Performs the Tribute to Flyleaf
 The Magnificent Seven Series: Strung Out on Foo Fighters [EP]
 Shape and Colour of My Heart: The String Quartet Tribute to Foo Fighters
 Unravel: The String Quartet Tribute to The Fray

G
 String Quartet Tribute to Peter Gabriel
 String Quartet Tribute to Garbage
 String Quartet Tribute to Godsmack's Godsmack (2008)
 Anthem: The String Quartet Tribute to Good Charlotte
 Vitamin String Quartet Performs Gorillaz
 Vitamin String Quartet Performs Gotye's Somebody That I Used To Know
 Vitamin String Quartet performs Green Day's American Idiot
 String Quartet Tribute to Green Day's When I Come Around
 String Quartet Tribute to Guns N' Roses The Dutchman
 String Quartet Tribute to Guns N' Roses

H
 String Quartet Tribute to PJ Harvey
 Arteries Untold: The String Quartet Tribute to Hawthorne Heights
 String Quartet Tribute to Jimi Hendrix
 Uninhibited: String Quartet Tribute to Hinder
 Leave Nothing Behind: Strung Out on Hoobastank - The String Quartet Tribute
 The String Quartet Tribute to HIM

I
 Vitamin String Quartet Performs Imogen Heap
 VSQ Performs Imagine Dragons
 String Quartet Tribute to Incubus
 New Skin: The String Quartet Tribute to Incubus Vol. 2
 Vitamin String Quartet Tribute to Incubus Vol. 3
 Anatomy of Evil - The String Quartet Tribute to Iron Maiden
 Interstellar: The String Quartet Tribute to Interpol
 Strung Out on INXS: The String Quartet Tribute

J
 String Quartet Tribute to James Blunt
 String Quartet Tribute to Jane's Addiction
 String Quartet Tribute to Jet
 String Quartet Tribute to Elton John
 String Quartet Tribute to John Lennon
 Vitamin String Quartet Performs Jason Mraz
 Vitamin String Quartet Performs Jason Mraz's I Won't Give Up
 VSQPerformss the Hits of Michael Jackson
 String Quartet Tribute to Jeff Buckley

K
 The String Quartet Tribute to Kanye West
 String Quartet Tribute to Kasabian: Processed Strings
 The String Quartet Tribute to The Killers
 String Quartet Tribute to KISS
 Hurt Inside: A String Quartet Tribute to KoЯn

L
 VSQ Performs Lady Gaga
 String Quartet Tribute to Lacuna Coil: Spiral Sounds
 Baroque Tribute to Led Zeppelin
 String Quartet Tribute to Led Zeppelin
 String Quartet Tribute to Led Zeppelin Vol. 2
 Break Stuff: The String Quartet Tribute to Limp Bizkit
 In the Chamber with Linkin Park: The String Quartet Tribute
 String Quartet Tribute to Linkin Park's Meteora
 String Quartet Tribute to Linkin Park's Minutes to Midnight
 Vitamin String Quartet Performs Lady Gaga's Born This Way
 Vitamin String Quartet Performs Linkin Park's A Thousand Suns
 String Quartet Tribute to Lynyrd Skynyrd - This Sweet Home
 String Quartet Tribute to Lorde's Royals
 String Quartet Tribute to Lana Del Rey's Summertime Sadness

M
 A Taste of Chaos Ensemble Performs Mastodon's Leviathan
 String Quartet Tribute to Madonna
 String Quartet Tribute to Paul McCartney
 String Quartet Tribute to Sarah McLachlan
 String Quartet Tribute to Moby
 String Quartet Tribute to Marilyn Manson
 Under Your Skin: The String Quartet Tribute to Maroon 5
 String Quartet Tribute to The Mars Volta's De-Loused In The Comatorium
 String Quartet Tribute to Massive Attack
 String Quartet Tribute to Matchbox Twenty
 Heavier Strings: A String Quartet Tribute to John Mayer’s Heavier Things
 Say Your Prayers, Little One: The String Quartet Tribute to Metallica
 The String Quartet Tribute to Morrissey
 String Quartet Tribute to Alanis Morissette
 Strung Out On Jagged Little Pill: The String Quartet Tribute to Alanis Morissette
 String Quartet Tribute to Muse
 VSQ Performs Muse's Survival
 Funeral: The String Quartet Tribute to My Chemical Romance

N
 String Quartet Tribute to New Order & Joy Division
 Someday: The String Quartet Tribute to Nickelback
 String Quartet Tribute to Nine Inch Nails
 Pretty Hate Machine: The String Quartet Tribute to Nine Inch Nails
 String Quartet Tribute to Nirvana
 String Quartet Tribute to Nirvana's Nevermind
 String Quartet Tribute to No Doubt
 Vitamin String Quartet Performs Nickelback, Volume 2

O
 String Quartet Tribute to The Offspring
 Decadence & Vanity: The String Quartet Tribute to Oasis
 Vitamin String Quartet Performs Owl City's Fireflies
 String Quartet Tribute to OneRepublic

P
 Strung Out on Panic! at the Disco: A String Quartet Tribute
 String Quartet Tribute to Panic! at the Disco's Pretty. Odd.
 Perfect Murder: Strung Out on Papa Roach
 String Quartet Tribute to Passenger (singer)'s Let Her Go
 The Magnificent Seven Series: The String Quartet Tribute to Paramore [EP]
 Strung Out on Paramore: String Quartet Tribute to Paramore
 Vitamin String Quartet Performs Paramore's Brand New Eyes
 The String Quartet Tribute to Pearl Jam
 Mad World: Strung Out on Pearl Jam: A String Quartet Tribute
 Vitamin String Quartet: Per_Versions
 Fervent: String Quartet Tribute to A Perfect Circle
 The String Quartet Tribute to A Perfect Circle
 The String Quartet Tribute to Phish
 String Quartet Tribute to Pink Floyd
 More Bricks: The String Quartet Tribute to Pink Floyd's The Wall
 String Quartet Tribute to Pink Floyd's The Dark Side of the Moon
 Vitamin String Quartet Performs Weezer's Pinkerton
 String Quartet Tribute to Pixies
 Revolution: The String Quartet Tribute to P.O.D.
 Symphonic Tribute to Prince's Purple Rain
 The String Quartet Tribute To Puddle Of Mudd

Q
 String Quartet Tribute to Queen
 Strings For The Deaf: The String Quartet Tribute to Queens of the Stone Age
 String Quartet Tribute to Queens of the Stone Age Vol.2

R
 Enigmatic: The String Quartet Tribute to Radiohead
 Strung Out on Kid A: The String Quartet Tribute to Radiohead
 Strung Out on In Rainbows: Vitamin String Quartet Performs Radiohead's In Rainbows
 Strung Out on OK Computer: The String Quartet Tribute to Radiohead
 Freedom: Tribute to Rage Against the Machine
 String Quartet Tribute to Red Jumpsuit Apparatus
 String Quartet Tribute to R.E.M.
 String Quartet Tribute to R.E.M. Vol. 2
 String Quartet Tribute to The Red Hot Chili Peppers
 String Quartet Tribute to Regina Spektor
 String Quartet Tribute to Relient K
 Vitamin String Quartet Tribute to Rise Against
 String Quartet Tribute to The Rolling Stones
 Exit... Stage Right: The String Quartet Tribute to Rush
 String Quartet Tribute to Rush’s 2112
 Through the Prism: The Classical Tribute to Rush

S
 Shake it Out- String Quartet Tribute to Florence + The Machine
 String Quartet Tribute to Santana
 String Quartet Tribute to Senses Fail
 Strung Out on Seether - The String Quartet Tribute
 String Quartet Tribute to Shinedown
 Vitamin String Quartet Tribute to Simple Plan
 VSQ Performs Sigur Ros
 Vitamin String Quartet Performs Skrillex
 The String Quartet Tribute to Slayer: The Death Angel Remains
 Evil You Dread: The String Quartet Tribute to Slayer
 String Quartet Tribute to Elliott Smith
 String Quartet Tribute to The Smiths
 String Quartet Tribute to Snow Patrol
 String Quartet Tribute to Sonic Youth
 Vitamin String Quartet Performs Soundgarden
 Hometown: The String Quartet Tribute to Bruce Springsteen
 In The Chamber with Staind: The String Quartet Tribute
 String Quartet Tribute to Gwen Stefani
 String Quartet Tribute to Switchfoot
 String Quartet Tribute to System of a Down
 The String Quartet Tribute to System of a Down's Mezmerize
 The String Quartet Tribute to System of a Down's Hypnotize
 String Quartet Tribute to The Smashing Pumpkins
 String Quartet Tribute to The Strokes
 String Quartet Tribute to Sum 41
 Sweater Weather - String Quartet Tribute to The Neighbourhood
Stitches: Vitamin String Quartet Rendition to Shawn Mendes

T
 The Magnificent Seven Series: The String Quartet Tribute to Thrice [EP]

 Strung Out on Thrice: A String Quartet Tribute
 The String Quartet Tribute to Tool's Ænima
Third Eye Open: The String Quartet Tribute to Tool
 Vitamin String Quartet Tribute to Tool's Lateralus
 Anotomica: The String Quartet Tribute to Tool
 Strung Out on Three Days Grace: A String Quartet Tribute
 Strung Out on Taking Back Sunday: A String Quartet Tribute
 The Vitamin String Quartet Tribute to Third Eye Blind
 The String Quartet Tribute to Thirty Seconds to Mars
 Vitamin String Quartet Performs Taylor Swift's Safe & Sound
 String Quartet Tribute to Train
 String Quartet Tribute to Tupac

U
 Strung Out on U2: The String Quartet Tribute
 Still Strung Out on U2: The String Quartet Vol. 2
 String Quartet Tribute to U2's The Joshua Tree
 The Vitamin String Quartet Plays U2's No Line on the Horizon
 Painted Red: Strung Out on Underoath
 Strung Out on The Used: The String Quartet Tribute

V
 String Quartet Tribute to The Velvet Underground & Nico
 Vitamin String Quartet Tribute to Vance Joy

W
 Dad, Get Me Out of This!: The String Quartet Tribute to Warren Zevon
 Come on and Kick Me!: The String Quartet Tribute to Weezer
 Pull This String: String Quartet Tribute to Weezer (re-release)
 String Quartet Tribute to The White Stripes
 The String Quartet Tribute to The Who's Tommy
 Vitamin String Quartet Performs We Belong

Y
 Olympus: The String Quartet Tribute to Yanni
 String Quartet Tribute to Yellowcard
 Rusted Moon: The String Quartet Tribute to Neil Young

Miscellaneous and compilations
 Blood Curdling Strings: VSQ Pays Tribute to Horror Classics (2011)
 The Gay Wedding Collection (2008)
 The Geek Wedding Collection (2015)
 Geek Wedding 2: The Sequel (2016)
 The Gothic Wedding Collection (2008)
 Modern Wedding Collection
 Modern Wedding Collection, Vol. 2
 My Metal Valentine (2008)
 The Rock 'n' Roll Wedding Collection (2008)
 The Rock 'n' Roll Valentine's Day Collection (2008)
 Songbirds: A VSQ Tribute to the Women of Modern Rock
 The String Quartet Tribute to Valentine's Day (2008)
 Strung Out Volume 1: The String Quartet Tribute to Modern Rock Hits
 Strung Out Volume 2: The String Quartet Tribute to Modern Rock Hits
 Strung Out Volume 3: The String Quartet Tribute to Alternative Rock Hits
 Strung Out Volume 4: The String Quartet Tribute to Hard Rock Hits
 Strung Out Volume 5: The String Quartet Tribute to 2007's Best Songs
 Strung Out Volume 6: The String Quartet Tribute to Music's Biggest Hits
 Strung Out Volume 7: The String Quartet Tribute
 Vitamin String Quartet Presents Strung Out Volume 8
 Vitamin String Quartet Presents Strung Out Volume 9
 Strung Out Vol. 10
 Strung Out Vol. 11: VSQ Tribute to Modern Rock Hits
 Strung Out on Indie Rock Vol. 1: The String Quartet Tribute (2008)
 The Tribute to Guitar Hero: Killer Tracks! (2008)
 Valentine's Day Massacre: The Emo Anti-Valentine's Day Collection (2008)
 The Vitamin String Quartet: The Tribute to Guitar Hero (2008)
 Vitamin String Quartet Performs the Hits of 2012, Vol. 1
 Vitamin String Quartet Performs The Hunger Games
 Vitamin String Quartet Performs Music from the Films of John Hughes 
 Vitamin String Quartet Performs Music from the Films of Wes Anderson 
 Vitamin String Quartet Performs the Songs from Glee (2009)
 Vitamin String Quartet Performs Music from Twilight (2008)
 Vitamin String Quartet Performs Music from Twilight Vol. 2 (2009)
 Vitamin String Quartet Tribute to Twilight: New Moon (2009)
 Vitamin String Quartet Tribute to Twilight: Eclipse (2010)
 Vitamin String Quartet Tribute to Twilight: Breaking Dawn – Part 1 (2011)
Vitamin String Quartet Tribute to Twilight: Breaking Dawn – Part 2 (2012)
 Vitamin String Quartet Performs Power Ballads
 Vitamin String Quartet Tribute to Harry Potter (2010)
 Vitamin String Quartet Tribute to The Nightmare Before Christmas
 Vitamin String Quartet Tribute to Star Wars (2010)
 Vitamin String Quartet Tribute to the Ladies of 90s Alt Rock
 VSQ Tribute: 90s Rock Hits
 VSQ Tribute to Alternative Hits of the 90s
 Vitamin String Quartet Performs Modern Rock Hits 2011, Vol. 1
 Vitamin String Quartet Performs Modern Rock Hits 2011, Vol. 2
 VSQ Performs Modern Rock Hits 2012, Vol. 1
 VSQ Performs Modern Rock Hits 2012, Vol. 2

References

External links
 
  CMH Label Group

American string quartets
Musical groups from Los Angeles
Vitamin Records artists
Musical groups established in 1999
1999 establishments in California